Joseph Ansah (born 5 November 1978) is a Ghanaian former professional footballer who played as a midfielder for Accra Hearts of Oak for most of his career. He also played for the Ghana national football team.

He was part of the 2000s Hearts of Oak team that won several laurels for the club. He won the Ghana Premier League 7 times  winning it in 4 consecutive seasons from 1999 to 2002. He helped the club win the 2000 CAF Champions League and the 2001 CAF Super Cup. He served as captain of the side within the 2000s.

At the international level, Ansah was a key member of the Ghana national under-17 football team from 1995 to 1997, featuring in two world cups in 1995 and 1997, in the process winning in 1995 and placing 4th in the 1997 edition.

Club career

Hearts of Oak 
Ansah started his career with Afienya United where he played there for two seasons from 1994 to 1996. He joined Accra Hearts of Oak in 1996–97 season winning the Ghana Premier League in his debut season. He went on to play for the club for 8 seasons from 1996 to 2005. He was the deputy captain and member of squad that won the CAF Champions League and Super Cup in 2000. He rose to become the deputy captain and captain of the side. He won the Ghana Premier League seven times, the Ghanaian FA Cup twice, and the Ghana Super Cup twice.

Tema Youth 
He later joined Tema Youth in July 2006. After a season, with the club he retired from football in July 2007.

International career 
Ansah was part of the Ghana U-17 side in 1995 to 1997 and was part of the squad that won the 1995 FIFA U-17 World Championship. featured for Ghana national football team twice between 1995 and 2003. He made his debut on 12 November 1995 in a friendly match against Sierra Leone which ended in a 2–0 victory.

Honours 
Hearts of Oak
 Ghana Premier League: 1996–97, 1997–98, 1999, 2000, 2001,2002, 2004
 Ghanaian FA Cup: 1999, 2000
 Ghana Super Cup: 1997, 1998
 CAF Champions League: 2000
 CAF Confederation Cup: 2004
 CAF Super Cup: 2001

Ghana U17
 FIFA U-17 World Championship: 1995

References

External links 
 
 

1978 births
Living people
Ghanaian footballers
Association football midfielders
Accra Hearts of Oak S.C. players
Tema Youth players
Ghana Premier League players
Ghana youth international footballers
Ghana international footballers